The year 1715 in architecture involved some significant events.

Buildings and structures

Buildings

 The Clarendon Building at the University of Oxford, England, designed by Nicholas Hawksmoor, is completed.
 St Philip's Cathedral, Birmingham, England, designed by Thomas Archer is consecrated as a parish church.
 Many batteries and redoubts are built in Malta. Surviving examples include Saint Mary's Battery, Qolla l-Bajda Battery, Briconet Redoubt and Vendôme Tower.
Filippo Juvarra starts working on the previously postponed construction of the church of Santa Christina in Turin.
Filippo Juvarra starts rebuilding the church of San Filippo Neri, Turin in which the roof had collapsed during the siege of Turin during the War of the Spanish Succession.
Fountain of the Tritons in Rome completed by Carlo Francesco Bizzaccheri.
Clarence House, 22 Watling Street, Thaxted, England, is completed.

Events
 Colen Campbell publishes the first volume of Vitruvius Britannicus, or the British Architect.

Births

Deaths

References

architecture
Years in architecture
18th-century architecture